Agrius (Ancient Greek: Ἄγριος means 'wild, savage') in Greek mythology, is a name that may refer to:

Agrius, one of the Giants, sons of Gaia. He, together with Thoon, was clubbed to death by Moirai with maces made from bronze, during the Gigantomachy, the battle of the Giants versus the Olympian gods.
Agrius, son of King Porthaon of Calydon.
Agrius, son of Polyphonte and a bear. He was the twin brother of Oreius.
Agrius, one of the Centaurs who Heracles fought with.
Agrius, son of Odysseus by Circe and a brother of Latinus and Telegonus, mentioned only in Hesiod's Theogony.
Agrius, one of the Suitors of Penelope who came from Dulichium along with other 56 wooers. He, with the other suitors, was slain by Odysseus with the aid of Eumaeus, Philoetius, and Telemachus.
Agrius, one of Actaeon's dogs.

The city of Agrinio, the largest city in Aetolia, took its name from Agrius.

Notes

References 

Antoninus Liberalis, The Metamorphoses of Antoninus Liberalis translated by Francis Celoria (Routledge 1992). Online version at the Topos Text Project.
Apollodorus, The Library with an English Translation by Sir James George Frazer, F.B.A., F.R.S. in 2 Volumes, Cambridge, MA, Harvard University Press; London, William Heinemann Ltd. 1921. ISBN 0-674-99135-4. Online version at the Perseus Digital Library. Greek text available from the same website.
Gaius Julius Hyginus, Fabulae from The Myths of Hyginus translated and edited by Mary Grant. University of Kansas Publications in Humanistic Studies. Online version at the Topos Text Project.
Graves, Robert, The Greek Myths, Harmondsworth, London, England, Penguin Books, 1960. 
Graves, Robert, The Greek Myths: The Complete and Definitive Edition. Penguin Books Limited. 2017. 
 Hesiod, Theogony from The Homeric Hymns and Homerica with an English Translation by Hugh G. Evelyn-White, Cambridge, MA.,Harvard University Press; London, William Heinemann Ltd. 1914. Online version at the Perseus Digital Library. Greek text available from the same website.

Gigantes
Centaurs
Children of Odysseus
Children of Circe
Suitors of Penelope
Deeds of Zeus
Mythology of Heracles